Giorgos Merkis (born 30 July 1984) is a retired Cypriot professional footballer who played as a centre back for Cypriot First Division club Apollon  and the Cyprus national team.

Career

Apollon Limassol
Merkis is a product of Apollon Limassol academies, making his first team debut during 2001–02 season at the age of 17. He spent the vast majority of his career with Apollon, where he won one championship, two cups and one super cup. After fifteen years at the club, his contract was mutually terminated on 12 January 2016.

APOEL
On 12 January 2016, Merkis signed an 18-month contract with fellow Cypriot First Division club APOEL. He made his official debut on 17 January 2016, coming on as a 69th-minute substitute in APOEL's 3–0 home win against Enosis Neon Paralimni for the Cypriot First Division. He scored his first goal for APOEL against his former team Apollon Limassol on 2 April 2016, netting a late equalizer in his team's 2–2 home draw for the Cypriot First Division Championship play-offs. A few months after joining APOEL, he was crowned champion as his team won the Cypriot First Division title for a fourth consecutive time.

On 2 March 2017, Merkis signed a two-year contract extension with APOEL, running until 31 May 2019.

International career
Merkis made his international debut with Cyprus National Team on 1 March 2006, in friendly match against Armenia at Tsirion Stadium, coming on as a 79th-minute substitute in Cyprus' 2–0 win. He scored his first goal on 16 November 2014, netting the opening goal in Cyprus' 5–0 home victory against Andorra for the UEFA Euro 2016 qualifiers.

International goals
Scores and results list Cyprus' goal tally first.

Honours
Apollon Limassol
Cypriot First Division: 2005–06
Cypriot Cup: 2009–10, 2012–13

APOEL
Cypriot First Division: 2015–16, 2016–17, 2017–18, 2018–19
Cypriot Super Cup: 2019

Personal life
On June 3, 2017 Merkis married with Cypriot journalist Andrea Kyriakou. On October 8, 2018 Kyriakou gave birth to their first child, a son Labrinos Merkis.

References

External links
 APOEL official profile 
 
 
 

1984 births
Living people
Sportspeople from Limassol
Greek Cypriot people
Cypriot footballers
Association football defenders
Apollon Limassol FC players
APOEL FC players
Cypriot First Division players
Cyprus international footballers